Adam Jamal Craig (born April 17, 1978) is an American actor. 
He is best known for his role as Special Agent Dominic Vail in NCIS: Los Angeles, a spin-off of NCIS. He owns a small IT company named HyperNerd Inc.

Filmography

External links

 

Living people
Place of birth missing (living people)
African-American male actors
Webster University alumni
American male television actors
1981 births
21st-century African-American people
20th-century African-American people